The 2015 Wakefield Metropolitan District Council election took place on 7 May 2015 to elect members of Wakefield Metropolitan District Council in England. This was on the same day as other local elections. The Labour Party and Conservatives fielded a full slate of 21 candidates, with UKIP putting forward 17 candidates. There were 9 Green candidates, 9 TUSC candidates and 6 Liberal Democrat candidates. Also standing were 2 Yorkshire First representatives, and one Independent.

Council Make-up
The make up of the Council following the election was:

Summary 

 
 +/- compared with Wakefield Council election 2014.

Ward results

Ackworth, North Elmsall and Upton ward

Airedale and Ferry Fryston ward

Altofts and Whitwood ward

Castleford Central and Glasshoughton ward

Crofton, Ryhill and Walton ward

Featherstone ward

Hemsworth ward

Horbury and South Ossett ward

Knottingley ward

Normanton ward

Ossett ward

Pontefract North ward

Pontefract South

South Elmsall and South Kirkby ward

Stanley and Outwood East ward

Wakefield East ward

Wakefield North ward

Wakefield Rural ward

Wakefield South ward

Wakefield West ward

Wrenthorpe and Outwood West ward

References

2015 English local elections
May 2015 events in the United Kingdom
2015
2010s in West Yorkshire